The Gibraltar Mine is a Canadian copper mine operated by Taseko Mines near McLeese Lake in British Columbia, Canada. It is the second largest open-pit mine in Canada and the fourth largest in North America.

The mine is the largest employer in the Cariboo region.

Gibraltar was originally opened by Placer Development Ltd. of Vancouver in 1972. The property was sold in 1996 to Westmin Resources which closed the mine in 1998. In July 1999, Taseko Mines purchased Gibraltar and re-opened it in October 2004, taking over operations in 2006.

In May 2006, the Phase I expansion was announced. The concentrator capacity was increased from 36,750 to 46,000 tonnes per day (tpd) at a cost of $76 million. The phase II expansion – which began in May 2007 – saw the concentrator capacity increased from 46,000 to 55,000 tpd in a semi-autogenous grinding mill at a cost of $40 million. The mine went through addition upgrades during a third development phase which cost $325 million, increasing the design capacity of Gibraltar to 85,000 tpd.

Taseko reported reserves of 2.4 billion pounds of copper and 69 million pounds of molybdenum in 2007.

See also
List of copper mines in Canada
Mount Polley mine
Highland Valley Copper mine
New Afton mine

References

Cariboo Regional District
Copper mines in British Columbia
Economy of British Columbia
Mining in British Columbia
Molybdenum mines in Canada
Open-pit mines